The Pine Valley Beijing Open was a men's professional golf tournament, played in 2007 and 2008. It was held at Pine Valley Golf Club in Beijing, China.

Originally an event on the Asian Tour, and co-sanctioned by the Japan Golf Tour in 2008, it became a founding tournament of the OneAsia Tour in 2009. However it was called off just a few weeks before it was due to be held, with organisers officially citing the state of the course and a clash of dates with The Players Championship on the PGA Tour. Some media commentators dismissed these reasons as the tournament had clashed with the Players Championship the previous year, and attributed the cancellation to sponsor discontent with the sanctioning changes.

Winners

Notes

References

External links
Coverage on the Asian Tour's official site
Coverage on the Japan Golf Tour's official site

Former Asian Tour events
Former Japan Golf Tour events
Golf tournaments in China
Recurring sporting events established in 2007
Recurring sporting events disestablished in 2008
2007 establishments in China
2008 disestablishments in China